"Don't Take It Personal (Just One of Dem Days)" is a song by American recording artist Monica. It was written by Dallas Austin, Willie James Baker, and Derrick Simmons for her debut album, Miss Thang (1995), while production was helmed by the former. The song is built around samples of "Bring the Noise" (1987) by American hip hop group Public Enemy, and "Back Seat (Of My Jeep)" (1993) by American rapper LL Cool J, which itself samples elements from the song "You're Gettin' a Little Too Smart" (1973) by R&B vocal group The Detroit Emeralds. Due to the inclusion of the samples, several other writers are credited as songwriters.

The song was released as Monica's debut single in early 1995. A major success, it sold 1.2 million copies domestically, going platinum in the United States, where it spent two weeks at number-one on the US Billboard Hot R&B Songs chart, and peaked at number two for three non consecutive weeks on the Billboard Hot 100. "Don't Take It Personal (Just One of Dem Days)" also reached the top ten in Australia and New Zealand, where it was certified gold and platinum, respectively. The song, alongside follow-up single "Before You Walk Out of My Life," made Monica the youngest recording artist to have two consecutive number-one hits on the Billboard R&B chart at the age of fourteen.

Composition
"Don't Take It Personal (Just One of Dem Days)" is a mid-tempo song lasting four minutes and eighteen seconds, while drawing influence from hip hop and R&B music genres. Written by Dallas Austin, Willie James Baker, Derrick Simmons and herself, and produced by the former, the song samples of "Bring the Noise" (1987) by American hip hop group Public Enemy, and "Back Seat (Of My Jeep)" (1993) by American rapper LL Cool J, which itself samples elements from the song "You're Gettin' a Little Too Smart" (1973) by R&B vocal group The Detroit Emeralds. Due to its sampling, additional writers such as Carl Ridenhour, Hank Shocklee, Eric "Vietnam" Sadler, James Brown, George Clinton, LL Cool J, Quincy Jones III, and Abrim Tilmon, Jr. are credited as songwriters. When asked about the development of the song, Austin elaborated: "When I did [it], I got her. I understood her attitude and I thought 'this is where we have to take her for the records' [...] I then took 'Don't Take It Personal' to play for Clive Davis, and he says, 'Well I don't know… it needs a bridge.' And I said, 'No, it doesn't (because of the style).' And he says, 'I don't understand why [the lyrics] say "Dem Days" instead of "Those Days"' (laughs). But I said 'That's not what we say in the environment. We say it's one of "dem days."'"

Critical reception
Steve Baltin from Cash Box wrote, "There’s very little attitude on this highly warm and accessible track. Technically, this is not an overly impressive single, but that doesn’t matter as most listeners aren’t seeking virtuosity, especially this time of year. With the weather getting warmer, these are the songs fans want—and Monica has delivered with the first hit uf the summer of ’95." James Masterton described it as "a very radio-friendly summer groove"in his weekly UK chart commentary in Dotmusic. Ralph Tee from Music Weeks RM Dance Update noted, "The label is a new urban soul offshoot for Arista in New York and Monica is a swing diva who debuts with an earthy two-stepper with 'live crowd' effects accompanying a phat bassline and all the appropriate snare and synth sounds. It's all written by Dallas Austin who warms things up nicely for the upcoming album Miss Thang. The track also contains a evident in the cut, which pumps along nicely."

Commercial performance
"Don't Take It Personal (Just One of Dem Days)" was released as the album's lead single in the United States in early 1995. It sold 1.2 million copies domestically and earned a platinum certification from the Recording Industry Association of America (RIAA). It spent two weeks at number-one on the US Billboard Hot R&B Songs chart and peaked at number two for three non consecutive weeks on the Billboard Hot 100. It also reached the top ten of the singles charts in Australia and New Zealand, where it was certified gold by the Australian Recording Industry Association (ARIA) and platinum by Recorded Music NZ, and entered the top 20 of the Dutch Single Top 100. "Don't Take It Personal (Just One of Dem Days)," alongside follow-up single "Before You Walk Out of My Life," would make the singer the youngest recording artist to have two consecutive number-one hits on the Billboard R&B chart at the age of fourteen.

Music video
An accompanying music video for "Don't Take It Personal (Just One of Dem Days)", shot in black-and-white, was directed by Rich Murray. It was sent to video stations like BET and local stations on February 21, 1995. It received nominations for Best R&B/Urban Clip and Best New R&B/Urban Artist Clip at the 1995 Billboard Music Video Awards.

Track listings

Credits and personnel
Credits lifted from the album's liner notes.
Monica Arnold – vocals
Dallas Austin – instruments, production
Leslie Brathwaite – engineering, mixing
Debra Killings – backing vocals

Charts

Weekly charts

Year-end charts

Certifications

Release history

Cover versions
 White Hinterland covered the song on her Eidolon EP.

See also
R&B number-one hits of 1995 (USA)

References

External links
 Monica.com — official Monica site

1993 songs
1995 debut singles
Arista Records singles
Monica (singer) songs
Rowdy Records singles
Song recordings produced by Dallas Austin
Songs written by Chuck D
Songs written by Dallas Austin
Songs written by Eric "Vietnam" Sadler
Songs written by Hank Shocklee
Songs written by LL Cool J
Songs written by James Brown
Songs written by George Clinton (funk musician)